Izabela Križaj (born 11 May 2000) is a Slovenian footballer who plays as a midfielder for Women's League club ŽNK Olimpija Ljubljana and the Slovenia women's national team.

Club career
Križaj is a Ajdovščina product. She has played for ŽNK Rudar Škale, ŽNK Radomlje and Olimpija Ljubljana in Slovenia.

International career
Križaj made her senior debut for Slovenia on 8 November 2018 as a 90th-minute substitution in a 2–0 friendly home win over Albania.

References

External links

2000 births
Living people
Slovenian women's footballers
Women's association football midfielders
ŽNK Radomlje players
ŽNK Olimpija Ljubljana players
Slovenia women's international footballers
Slovenian people of Albanian descent